Mainprize may refer to:

Mainprise
Mainprize Regional Park